Written and illustrated by Keisuke Itagaki, Baki the Grappler was serialized in Weekly Shōnen Champion magazine from 1991 to 1999, with the chapters collected into 42 tankōbon volumes by its publisher Akita Shoten. It was republished into 15 wide-ban volumes, divided by story arc, up to 2004 and into 24 kanzenban volumes between 2007 and 2008. It was licensed for a North American release by Gutsoon! Entertainment. They published the first 46 chapters in their English-language manga anthology magazine Raijin Comics. The magazine's first issue was released on December 18, 2002, but in July 2004 it was discontinued. Four collected volumes were planned but it is unknown if they were released.

Between June 1, 1999 and November 24, 2005, a sequel simply titled Baki was serialized in Weekly Shōnen Champion and collected into 31 tankōbon volumes. It was republished into 12 wide-ban volumes, divided by arc, beginning in 2006. This series was licensed for English release by Media Do International, who began releasing it digitally in August 2018. The company stated a future print release is possible and that they are interested in the original manga as well.

A third series, again serialized in Weekly Shōnen Champion, titled Baki Hanma began on December 1, 2005 and ended on August 16, 2012. It was originally collected into 37 tankōbon volumes, and republished into 5 wide-ban volumes

, the fourth series, was serialized in Weekly Shōnen Champion from March 20, 2014 to April 5, 2018, with the chapters collected into 22 tankōbon volumes.

A fifth series, also titled  but with Baki's name written in katakana instead of kanji, began serialization in Weekly Shōnen Champion on October 4, 2018.

Baki the Grappler

Baki

Baki Hanma

Baki-Dou

Baki Dou

References

Baki the Grappler
Baki